The Robert R. Wilson Prize for Achievement in the Physics of Particle Accelerators is an annual prize established in 1987 by the American Physical Society (APS) to recognize and encourage outstanding achievement, ordinarily by one person but sometimes to two or more physicists who have contributed to the same accomplishment, in the physics of particle accelerators. The prize consists of $10,000, a travel allowance to the APS meeting where the prize is formally awarded, and a certificate citing the prize-winning contributions of the recipient. The prize is named in honor of Robert R. Wilson.

Recipients

References 

Awards of the American Physical Society
Awards established in 1987